Gervais's beaked whale (Mesoplodon europaeus), sometimes known as the Antillean beaked whale, Gulf Stream beaked whale, or European beaked whale (from which its scientific name is derived) is the most frequently stranding type of mesoplodont whale off the coast of North America. It has also stranded off South America and Africa.

History of discovery

Sometime between 1836 and 1841, a captain of one of the ships of the French merchant and armorer Abel Vautier came across a large animal floating at the entrance to the English Channel, its body covered by swarming gulls. He cut the head off and transported it to Caen, where he presented it to Vautier. Vautier in turn offered it to the anatomist Deslongchamps. The specimen somehow made its way to the French scientist Paul Gervais, who described it as a new species in 1855. For several decades this remained as the only known specimen of this species, with many disregarding its specific status and claiming it merely represented an aberrant adult Sowerby's beaked whale. The species’ identity was confirmed by the discovery of two specimens from New Jersey, an immature male captured near Atlantic City in 1889 and an adult female found stranded at North Long Branch in 1905.

Description
This species is the largest of the mesoplodonts and rather gracile, elongated, and laterally compressed compared with the others. The mouthline is remarkably straight, even in males, and the two teeth of the male erupt towards the tip of the beak, and are hardly noticeable. The head is overall small and tapering in outline. The melon only bulges very slightly. The coloration is dark gray on top and lighter gray on bottom. Females sometimes have lighter spots near the genitals and face, with a dark circle remaining around the eyes. Juveniles start off with a lighter coloration, but soon darken. Calves are believed to be  in length. One beached specimen may have been 48 years old.

Population and distribution
Since the discovery of the type specimen, it has been found off the eastern coast of the United States, Ireland, the Canary Islands, western Africa, and Ascension Island. In August 2001, a specimen was found off São Paulo, Brazil, the southernmost specimen found to date. The species is believed to be naturally rare, and no population estimates have been attempted.

Although this species frequently strands, until 1998 no one had made a confirmed sighting of the species. Sightings remain rare.

There had been a possible stranding of this species in Israel.

Behavior
Judging by strandings, the whales occur in small groups. They probably feed on squid.

A sighting made in 1998, west of the island of Tenerife, involved three whales swimming over waters 1500 meters deep. Another small group was seen south of the island of Gran Canaria. Although timid, the whales allowed close photos. They surfaced for a short time, and their dives lasted for around an hour.

In September 2008, northeast of the island of Lanzarote, some Gervais' beaked whales were photographed breaching out of the water.

On May 5, 2011, one juvenile female specimen was found dead and beached at Playa Larga of Maunabo on the southeast corner of Puerto Rico (Caribbean Sea). The juvenile had her stomach filled with (10 pounds) of plastic bags. On July 10 of the same year, one specimen was found dead in the Yucatán Peninsula, México. Further investigation is being performed to confirm the species in this case.

Conservation
The species has not been hunted and only very infrequently gets tangled in fishing nets. Gervais's beaked whale is covered by the Agreement on the Conservation of Small Cetaceans of the Baltic, North East Atlantic, Irish and North Seas (ASCOBANS) and the Agreement on the Conservation of Cetaceans in the Black Sea, Mediterranean Sea and Contiguous Atlantic Area (ACCOBAMS). The species is further included in the Memorandum of Understanding Concerning the Conservation of the Manatee and Small Cetaceans of Western Africa and Macaronesia.

See also

List of cetaceans

References

Further reading
Encyclopedia of Marine Mammals. Edited by William F. Perrin, Bernd Wursig, and J.G.M Thewissen. Academic Press, 2002. 
Sea Mammals of the World. Written by Randall R. Reeves, Brent S. Steward, Phillip J. Clapham, and James A. Owell. A & C Black, London, 2002. 
A Gervais' beaked whale (Mesoplodon europaeus) washed ashore in southeastern Brazil: extra limital record? Santos, Zampirolli, Castro, and Alarenga. Aquatic Mammals 2003. 29.3, 404–410. Available: here

External links

ARKive – images and movies of the Gervais' beaked whale (Mesoplodon europaeus)
Beaked Whales Identication Guide(National Museum of Natural History)
Cetaceans of the World
CMS
Whale & Dolphin Conservation Society (WDCS)
Sightings of Gervais' beaked whales in the Canary Islands (Spanish)

Mesoplodont whales
Cetaceans of the Atlantic Ocean
Mammals of the Dominican Republic
Taxa named by Paul Gervais
Mammals described in 1855